Samuel Preston Bayard (April 10, 1908, in Pittsburgh, Pennsylvania – January 10, 1997, in State College, Pennsylvania) was an American folklorist and musicologist.  He received a B.A. in English from Pennsylvania State University in 1934 and later earned an M.A. from Harvard University.

He collected fiddle and fife tunes in southwestern Pennsylvania and northern West Virginia from 1928 to 1963.  He is known for his interest in the melodies of traditional music at a time when often only the texts were collected.  He introduced the concept of "melodic families", which are groups of tunes that appears to be structurally related.  He traced the origins of many traditional American fiddle tunes back to the British Isles.

In addition to his work on fiddle tunes, he was the expert on the use of the fife in traditional American music.  He is fondly remembered by former students for his large collection of snuffboxes, which he used regularly.

He established the folklore program at Pennsylvania State University, and taught there from 1945 to 1973

He was a fellow of the American Folklore Society, and its president from 1965 to 1966.

He died on January 10, 1997, in State College, Pennsylvania.  An award in his name has been established at Penn State for graduate students in comparative literature.

On-line publications
Samuel P. Bayard Tape Collection http://www.sas.upenn.edu/folklore/grad_program/handbook/Bayard.pdf
Hill Country Tunes (1944) http://www.mne.psu.edu/lamancusa/tunes/hct/index.htm
Guide to the Samuel P. Bayard Papers https://aspace.libraries.psu.edu/repositories/3/resources/2974
Samuel P. Bayard folklore recordings https://www.youtube.com/playlist?list=PLfkrWr_vIGB9l33oOjTC2M6JlhxfoPlQz

Bibliography

References

Obituaries
 

 

American folklorists
American folk-song collectors
Pennsylvania State University alumni
Harvard University alumni
1908 births
1997 deaths
Pennsylvania State University faculty
American fiddlers
20th-century American violinists
Presidents of the American Folklore Society